The 2018 Essendon Football Club season will be the Essendon Football Club's 120th season in the Australian Football League. They will also field a reserves team in the Victorian Football League.

AFL

List changes

Three veteran Essendon players decided to retire at the end of the 2017 season: two-time All-Australian Jobe Watson, former  three-time premiership player James Kelly and 255-game player Brent Stanton. After the season Essendon also announced that they had delisted Heath Hocking.

During trade period three different players requested trades to Essendon. The first trade to be completed was that of  player Devon Smith, who Essendon acquired with their first round pick for the 2017 draft.

Retirements and delistings

Trades

Squad

Ladder

References

Essendon Football Club seasons
2018 Australian Football League season